Sam Ashworth Tingle (24 August 1921 – 19 December 2008) was an English-born racing driver from Rhodesia, now Zimbabwe. He participated in five Formula One World Championship Grands Prix, and scored no championship points. He also competed in several non-Championship Formula One races.

Tingle was born in Manchester, United Kingdom, and made his Formula One debut on 28 December 1963.

He was one of only two drivers from Rhodesia to successfully enter a Formula One race, the other being John Love. A third Rhodesian racer, Clive Puzey, failed to qualify in his Formula One attempt. He died in Somerset West, South Africa, aged 87.

Complete Formula One World Championship results
(key)

Complete Formula One non-championship results
(key)

References

External links
Profile at grandprix.com

1921 births
2008 deaths
British emigrants to Rhodesia
Rhodesian Formula One drivers
English motorcycle racers
Sportspeople from Manchester
LDS Formula One drivers
Team Gunston Formula One drivers
White Rhodesian people
Formula One team owners
Formula One team principals
Rhodesian emigrants to South Africa